Lonchorhina is a genus of Central and South American bats in the family Phyllostomidae.

Species
Genus Lonchorhina - Sword-nosed bats
Tomes's sword-nosed bat, Lonchorhina aurita - Tomes, 1863
Fernandez's sword-nosed bat, Lonchorhina fernandezi - Ochoa & Ibanez, 1982
Northern sword-nosed bat, Lonchorhina inusitata - Handley & Ochoa, 1997
Marinkelle's sword-nosed bat, Lonchorhina marinkellei - Camacho & Cadena, 1978
Orinoco sword-nosed bat, Lonchorhina orinocensis - Linares & Ojasti, 1971
Chiribiquete sword-nosed bat, Lonchorhina mankomara - Mantilla-Meluk & Montenegro, 2016

References

 
Bat genera
Taxa named by Robert Fisher Tomes